is a passenger railway station in the city of Ōta, Gunma, Japan, operated by the private railway operator Tōbu Railway.

Lines

Station layout
The station consists of a single island platform, connected to the station building by an underground passageway.

Platforms

Adjacent stations

History
The station opened on 1 October 1927.

From 17 March 2012, station numbering was introduced on all Tobu lines, with Hosoya Station becoming "TI-19".

Passenger statistics
In fiscal 2019, the station was used by an average of 2710 passengers daily (boarding passengers only).

Surrounding area
Kanto Gakuen University
Hoizumi Post Office

References

External links

 Tobu station information  

Stations of Tobu Railway
Tobu Isesaki Line
Railway stations in Gunma Prefecture
Railway stations in Japan opened in 1927
Ōta, Gunma